Johannes Stelling (12 May 1877 – 21/22 June 1933) was a German political activist who became a leading SPD politician during the Weimar years.   He served between 1921 and 1924 as First Minister (Ministerpräsident) of Mecklenburg-Schwerin.

Johannes Stelling was murdered by Nazi quasi-militaries on 21/22 June 1933.

Life

Provenance and early years
Stelling was born in the dynamic port city of Hamburg. His father worked as a tailor:  his mother worked as a cook. He attended school locally before undertaking a commercial apprenticeship in 1892, completing it successfully in 1895. On completion of his training he entered the work force, working for a few years in the trade for which he had trained, later becoming involved in various strikes called in support of higher wages and shorter working hours, and becoming caught up in the feverish industrial relations atmosphere which had become a feature of Hamburg at the turn of the century following several decades of rapid economic growth and urban expansion. In 1901, which was also the year of his marriage and the year in which he joined the Social Democratic party, he relocated to Lübeck, a short distance to the east. His period as editor was a long one, and according to the biographical note on Stelling that appears, alongside those of other members, in the "Reichstag Handbooks" of subsequent decades, he was imprisoned several times during these years.

City politics
In 1905 the first four Social Democrats were elected to the city council of Lübeck. One of them was Johannes Stelling. For the next few years Stelling struggled to promote the interests of his supporters as a city councillor, while leaving no one in any doubt about his commitment to peace during a period characterised by rising military expenditure in Germany, Russia and Britain. Nevertheless, when, in July 1914, war broke out, like most party members, Stelling and the newspaper he edited followed the party line, which effectively meant postponing class struggle in order to focus on winning the war.

From 1916 Stelling belonged to Lübeck's "Kriegshilfe"  and "Landesversorgungsamt", created to provide welfare support to war victims. In 1917, when the SPD split over the issue of continuing support for the war, he remained steadfast in his support for the mainstream party, while anti-war party colleagues broke away to form the Independent Social Democratic Party of Germany (which after the war would form the basis for the creation of the German Communist Party). The end of the war was followed by a plethora of political uprisings in Germany. This led to a constitutional revolution defined partly by the demands of German insurgents and partly by the requirements of the French, British and US politicians represented at the post war peace conference. Through the instability and desperate austerity of 1919 Stelling used his position on the city council and his role as a newspaper editor to campaigned energetically against war and in favour of revolutionary democratic changes.

National politics
Revolutionary democratic changes had been adumbrated in November 1918 when the Kaiser abdicated and moved to a small town near Utrecht in the Netherlands. Three months later, in February 1919, an assembly was convened at Weimar in central southern Germany, mandated to draft a post-imperial constitution. Delegates were elected using proportional representation. Women were allowed to vote. The assembly therefore enjoyed a far greater level of democratic legitimacy than the previous Reichstags which had been elected under the old cumbersome "three class voting system". In terms of support the SPD in Lübeck had come a long way since 1905, and was now the largest party on the city council. Johannes Stelling, already a leading figure in city politics, was now elected as a member of the constitutional assembly meeting in Weimar.

The Weimar assembly turned out to be the precursor to the Reichstag of the new German republic. Stelling was elected a member in the June 1920 general election and continued to be re-elected thereafter, sitting continuously as an SPD Reichstag member until 1933, apart from a seven-month absence between May and December 1924.

Regional politics
During the early 1920s Stelling was also prominent in the regional politics of Mecklenburg-Schwerin, the region directly to the east of Lübeck. The new republican arrangements provided for a Mecklenburg-Schwerin regional legislative assembly ("Landtag des Freistaates Mecklenburg-Schwerin"). Johannes Stelling combined his membership of the German Reichstag in Berlin with a seat in the regional assembly at Schwerin between 1920 and 1924. His party, the SPD, held more than 40% of the seats in the chamber during this period and accordingly dominated the regional government. Between 1919/1920 and 1921 Stelling served as he regional Interior Minister, and then between 19 January 1921 and 18 March 1924 he served as First Minister (Ministerpräsident) of Mecklenburg-Schwerin.   In the regional elections of February 1924 there was a major swing against the SPD, which was consistent with national trends as the SPD government was blamed for the Hyperinflation crisis: after February 1924 Stelling was no longer a member of the Mecklenburg-Schwerin Landtag.

Party role
In 1924 Johannes Stelling became a member of the SPD leadership team, initially as Party Secretary.   He also became a leading member, on behalf of the SPD, of the Black-red-gold national flag organisation, established by the major moderate political parties to oppose anti-democratic extremism.   By the later 1920s the Stelling family had relocated, like many upwardly mobile working-class families, to one of the fashionable houses in the new residential developments behind the railway station in the rapidly expanding Berlin quarter of Köpenick.

Régime change and murder
The political backdrop changed dramatically early in 1933 when the Nazi party took power and lost little time in imposing one-party dictatorship on Germany. By May 1933 many SPD leaders had moved to Prague where they set up a SPD leadership structure in exile. Stelling was urged to accompany the others, but preferred to remain in Germany and serve as a link man between the party leadership in Prague and the party membership left behind in Nazi Germany.

Stelling was prominent and uncompromising in opposing political extremism, and did not hesitate to give voice at home and internationally to the burgeoning suspicion that Reichstag fire, cited by the Hitler government as a justification for their suspension of democracy, had somehow been triggered by the Nazi government itself.   The suggestion enraged the Nazis. Overnight on 21/22 June, under orders from a commander in the Nazi Party's military wing called Herbert Gehrke, Johannes Stelling was arrested, along with several other who shared his political views. One fellow party member arrested at the same time, along with his son, was Heinrich Reinefeld, a lawyer who was an eye witness to some of what happened next, and who survived to give his account of it.
   Stelling was one of a group of detainees taken to an ad hoc detention centre in the Gaststätte Seidler ("Seidler restaurant") in the nearby Uhlenhorstin district.  Here they were assaulted and tortured by more than 150 SA members.

Ten days later, on 10 July, a large bag weighted down with stones was pulled out of the Dahme (river). Along with the stones it contained the body of a man, distorted by multiple gunshot wounds to its upper torso. The body could not be identified, but a wedding ring and the initials sewn onto the accompanying handkerchief revealed it to be the body of Johannes Stelling, and it was handed over to his relatives for disposal.

The burial took place on 24 August 1933 at the Friedrichsfelde Cemetery.  On 4 December 1950 the grave was repositioned and integrated into the Socialists' Memorial Area in the same cemetery, which in the intervening seventeen years had become the most prestigious cemetery in East Berlin, itself by this time the capital of a new one-party dictatorship.

Stelling's murder has come to be recognised as part of a larger action in the Berlin quarter of Köpenick, and to be identified as the Köpenicker Blutwoche ("Köpenick's week of bloodshed"). In the Berlin region it gained a certain notoriety early on, which the Nazis were content to encourage as a warning that opposition to the new régime should be avoided.   Fifteen years later the Soviet administration in the Soviet occupation zone, and their successors after 1949 in charge of the Soviet sponsored German Democratic Republic (East Germany), were keen to play up atrocities committed by the Nazi regime. In both cases, the "Köpenicker Blutwoche" may not have been the greatest of the Nazi atrocities, but it was one of the first on such a scale, and it has attracted the attention of later writers because of this. Johannes Stelling and the businessman Georg Eppenstein were probably its most prominent victims.

References

Politicians from Hamburg
Politicians from Lübeck
Members of the Weimar National Assembly
Members of the Reichstag of the Weimar Republic
Social Democratic Party of Germany politicians
German murder victims
German journalists
Reichsbanner Schwarz-Rot-Gold members
1877 births
1933 deaths